George Michael Sheldrick, FRS (born 17 November 1942, in Huddersfield, England) is a British chemist who specialises in molecular structure determination. He is one of the most cited workers in the field, having over 280,000 citations as of 2020 and an h-index of 113. He was a professor at the University of Göttingen from 1978 until his retirement in 2011.

Early life
Sheldrick was born on 17 November 1942 in Huddersfield, England. He was educated at Huddersfield New College, then an all-boys grammar school. He completed 9 O-Levels, 6 A-Levels, and 2 S-Levels. At A-Level, he achieved a distinction (the highest grade) in chemistry, mathematics and physics.

Sheldrick was awarded a Major Scholarship to study Natural Sciences at Jesus College, Cambridge. He specialised in chemistry in his final year. He graduated in 1963 with a first class Bachelor of Arts (BA) degree. He remained at the University of Cambridge to undertake postgraduate research under the supervision of Evelyn Ebsworth. He completed his Doctor of Philosophy (PhD) degree in 1966. The topic of his thesis was the investigation of inorganic hydrides using nuclear magnetic resonance spectroscopy, and was title "N.M.R. Studies of Inorganic Hydrides".

Academic career
In 1966, Sheldrick was elected a Fellow of Jesus College, Cambridge. During his time as an academic at the University of Cambridge, he also taught within the Faculty of Chemistry. He was a demonstrator from 1966 to 1971, and a lecturer from 1971 to 1978.

Sheldrick joined the University of Göttingen in 1978. There, he was first Professor of Inorganic Chemistry, then later Professor of Structural Chemistry. In 2011, he retired from full-time academia and was appointed Niedersachsen Professor (IE Emeritus Professor).

Work
Sheldrick deals with molecular structure elucidation by X-ray diffraction. He is the lead developer of the SHELX program suite, which is freely available online. In 2011, a graphical user interface for SHELX refinements called ShelXle was released.

Personal life
On 13 July 1968, Sheldrick married Katherine Elizabeth Herford. Together they have four children.

His younger brother, William S. Sheldrick (1945-2015), was a professor of analytical chemistry at Ruhr University in Bochum, Germany until his retirement in 2010.

Honours
1970 Meldola Medal of the Royal Society of Chemistry
1978 Corday-Morgan Prize of the Royal Society of Chemistry
1988 Gottfried Wilhelm Leibniz Prize of the Deutsche Forschungsgemeinschaft
1999 Carl-Hermann Medal of the German Society for Crystallography
2001 Fellow of the Royal Society
2004 Max Perutz Prize of the European Crystallographic Association
2009 Gregori Aminoff Prize of the Royal Swedish Academy of Sciences
2011 Ewald Prize of the International Union of Crystallography

References

External links
Homepage

English chemists
British crystallographers
Alumni of Jesus College, Cambridge
1942 births
Living people
Fellows of the Royal Society
Academic staff of the University of Göttingen
People educated at Huddersfield New College
Fellows of Jesus College, Cambridge